Elena Besova (born 8 July 1966) is a retired Russian judoka who won a silver medal at the 1990 European Championships. She competed in the 1992 Olympics, but was eliminated in the first bout. Later that year she won the Russian championships.

References

1966 births
Living people
Olympic judoka of the Unified Team
Judoka at the 1992 Summer Olympics
Russian female judoka